The Internationale Wielertrofee Jong Maar Moedig was a professional cycling race held annually in Belgium between 1985 and 2019.

It was first held in 1985 under the name Grand Prix Jerry Blondel. In 1987 it was renamed Trophée Cycliste International Jerry Blondel. From 1998 it was known as the Internationale Wielertrofee Jong Maar Moedig. It was a part of the UCI Europe Tour from 2005 as a category 1.2 race. The race was cancelled in 2020 and 2021 due to the COVID-19 pandemic in Belgium, before being definitively cancelled later in 2021.

Winners

References

External links

Cycle races in Belgium
UCI Europe Tour races
Recurring sporting events established in 1985
1985 establishments in Belgium
Recurring sporting events disestablished in 2021
2021 disestablishments in Belgium